Iffou Region is one of the 31 regions of Ivory Coast. Since its establishment in 2011, it has been one of the regions in Lacs District. The seat of the region is Daoukro, and the region's population in the 2021 census was 378,560.

Iffou is currently divided into four departments: Daoukro, M'Bahiakro, Ouellé, and Prikro.

Notes

 
Regions of Lacs District
States and territories established in 2011
2011 establishments in Ivory Coast